Durga is 1990 Tamil-language children's film, directed and written by Rama Narayanan, with dialogue written by Pugazhmani. Music was by Shankar–Ganesh. The film stars Baby Shamili (Dual role) playing the titular role, with Nizhalgal Ravi, Kanaka and Kitty playing lead with Sathyapriya, Vagai Chandrasekhar, Senthil and Vennira Aadai Moorthy playing a pivotal role. The movie fared well at the box office. The film was dubbed into Telugu as Lakshmi Durga in 1990 and dubbed into Hindi as Devi Aur Durga in 1992. Also, the film was remade in Kannada as Bhairavi in 1991.

Plot 
Durga is the only daughter of a wealthy couple. After her father's, Durga's uncle tries to seize all the wealth and kills Durga's mother. Kitty also plans to kill Durga, but she escapes with the help of her pets – a monkey Ramu and a dog Raja. Durga meets Muthu, an innocent guy and befriends him. Kannamma is a karakattam dancer and she falls in love with Muthu and they both decide to help Durga.

Meanwhile, Kitty searches for Durga to kill her so that he can enjoy the wealth. Durga returns to her home along with Muthu and Kannamma, which shocks Kitty as Durga is protected by them now. Surprisingly, Kitty meets Malliga, a look-alike of Durga. Malliga is the daughter of a poor disabled guy. Kitty forces Malliga to act as Durga by threatening to kill her father, so that he can create chaos between the two and in the process he can kill the real Durga.

Finally, there comes a situation where both Durga and Malliga have to walk over the fire in a temple to prove their real identity. Durga successfully walks over the fire. But before Malliga starts walking, her father comes and rescues her. He also informs about Kitty's plans to everyone and Kitty accidentally jumps on the fire and dies while saving himself. In the end, Durga accepts Malliga in her house. Muthu and Kannamma also stay with them.

Cast 
Baby Shamili as Durga/Mallika 
Nizhalgal Ravi as Muthu 
Kanaka as Kannamma 
Kitty as Durga's Uncle 
Sathyapriya as Durga's mother
Chandrasekhar as Mallika's father
Varalakshmi as Muthu's mother
Senthil as Vellaiyan 
Vennira Aadai Moorthy as  Dr. Marcosa 
Bayilvan Ranganathan as Ranga

Soundtrack

Tamil Version 

Music was by Shankar–Ganesh and lyrics were written by Vaali.

Telugu Version (Dubbed)

Releases 
Durga Tamil was released on 10 August 1990. Later, the film was dubbed into Telugu as Lakshmi Durga (1990) and dubbed into Hindi as Devi Aur Durga (1992). The film was remade in Kannada as Bhairavi in 1991. In Kannada, Baby Shamili enacted in the same role.

References

External links 
 

1990 drama films
1990 films
1990s Tamil-language films
Films about dogs
Films scored by Shankar–Ganesh
Indian children's films
Tamil films remade in other languages